The city of Augusta, Georgia, the largest city and the county seat of Richmond County, Georgia, is the birthplace and home of several notable individuals. This is a list of people from Augusta, Georgia and includes people who were born or lived in Augusta for a nontrivial amount of time. Individuals included in this listing are people presumed to be notable because they have received significant coverage in reliable sources that are independent of the subject.

Augusta was first used by Native Americans as a place to cross the Savannah River, because of Augusta's location on the fall line. The city was the second state capital of Georgia from 1785 until 1795 (alternating for a period with Savannah, the first).

Actors

Arts and design

Athletics
 

Devonte Upson (born 1993), basketball player in the Israeli Basketball Premier League

Education

Literature and journalism

African American pioneers

Military

Music

Politics and government

Radio and television personalities

Science and technology

See also

List of mayors of Augusta, Georgia

References

External links
Cedar Grove cemetery — historic black cemetery (includes gravesite photos and information on Augustans interred there)

Augusta, Georgia
 
Augusta